Michael Habte (born 21 August 2000) is an Eritrean footballer who plays for Adulis Club of the Eritrean Premier League, and the Eritrea national team.

Club career
Born in England, Habte began playing football at age eight. He came up through the academy system of Dartford F.C. before earning promotion to the first team in the National League South for the 2016–17 season. He made a total of seven appearances for the club before departing following the 2017–18 season. Following his departure from Dartford he joined Adulis Club of the Eritrean Premier League to gain the attention of the Eritrean National Football Federation.

International career
Habte played at the youth level for Eritrea in a friendly against South Sudan in December 2018. In September 2019 he was part of the Eritrea squad for the 2019 CECAFA U-20 Championship. He scored in a 7–0 Group Stage victory over Djibouti en route to a third place finish in the tournament. 

He made his senior international debut on 11 December 2019 in a 2019 CECAFA Cup match against Uganda. He went on to score his first international goal in the semi-finals of the tournament in a 4–1 victory over Kenya. Eritrea went on to finish as surprise runners-up of the tournament. In July 2021 Habte was part of Eritrea's squad for the 2021 CECAFA U-23 Challenge Cup. He was in the starting lineup for the team's second match, an eventual 0–3 defeat to Burundi.

International goals
Scores and results list Eritrea's goal tally first.

International career statistics

References

External links
National Football Teams profile
Soccerway profile

2000 births
Eritrean footballers
Eritrea international footballers
Living people
Association football midfielders